Alex Baudin (born 25 May 2001) is a French racing cyclist, who currently rides for UCI WorldTeam .

Career
In 2022 during the Tour de Bretagne Baudin won stage 3 putting himself into the leaders jersey. Baudin lost the lead in the following stage after Johan Le Bon launched a long range attack winning the stage by 59 seconds and taking the lead. In the Giro della Valle d'Aosta, on stage 3, Baudin placed himself in the breakaway and managed to stay away to give himself the stage win.

On 2 August 2022 it was announced Baudin would ride for UCI WorldTeam  in 2023.

Major results
Sources:

2018
 1st Stage 4 Tour du Pays de Vaud
 5th Overall Ain Bugey Valromey Tour
1st  Young rider classification
1st Stages 2 & 3
 8th Overall Giro del Nordest d'Italia
2019
 3rd Chrono_des_Nations
 4th GP Général Patton
 8th Overall Tour du Pays de Vaud
1st Stage 3
2021
 1st  Overall Tour de Côte d'Or
 1st Grand Prix du Val de Villé
2022
 1st Stage 3 Giro della Valle d'Aosta
 2nd Overall Istrian Spring Trophy
1st Stage 2
 2nd Overall Tour de Bretagne
1st  Young rider classification
1st Stage 3

References

External links
 

2001 births
Living people
French male cyclists